The Best of Silly Wizard is an album by Silly Wizard released in 1985 by Shanachie Records.  This album has selections from previous recordings by the band.

Track listing
"The Valley of Strathmore" (6:17)
"Donald McGillavry / O'Neill's Cavalry March" (4:09)
"A.A Cameron's Strathspey / Mrs. Martha Knowles / The Pitnacree Ferryman / The New Shillin'" (4:26)
"The Fishermen's Song" (5:53)
"The Queen of Argyll" (3:28)
"Finlay M. MacRae" (3:36)
"The Pearl" (3:54)
"Isla Waters" (3:53)
"Mo Chuachag Laghach (My Kindly Sweetheart)" (2:27)
"Broom O' the Cowdenknowes" (5:24)
"Green Fields of Glentown / The Galtee Reel / Bobby Casey's Number Two / Wing Commander Donald MacKenzie's Reel" (4:43)

Personnel
Phil Cunningham - Accordion, whistle, vocals, keyboards, mandola, guitar, synthesizers, electric piano, piano, harmonium
Johnny Cunningham - Fiddles, vocals, viola
Andy M. Stewart - Lead vocals, tenor banjo, whistle, mandolin
Martin Hadden - Electric bass, fretless bass, guitar, harmonium, string synthesizers, piano, electric piano, vocals
Gordon Jones - Guitar, bodhran, mandola, vocals
Bob Thomas - Guitar

1985 compilation albums
Silly Wizard albums